Arturo Ramírez Bucio (born 7 May 1962) is a Mexican politician from the National Action Party. From 2009 to 2012 he served as Deputy of the LXI Legislature of the Mexican Congress representing Zacatecas.

References

1962 births
Living people
Politicians from Mexico City
National Action Party (Mexico) politicians
21st-century Mexican politicians
Deputies of the LXI Legislature of Mexico
Members of the Chamber of Deputies (Mexico) for Zacatecas